Camilo Egas (1889-September 18, 1962) was an Ecuadorian master painter and teacher, who was also active in the United States and Europe. Camilo Egas was married in Paris 1927 to Dancer and artist Margarita Gibbons. 
Camilo Egas museo illustrates a self portrait of the artist of 1946 that is on the cover of a pamphlet published by them then used for a book Jan 2003 edition by del Banco central del Ecuador

Early life and education
Camilo Alejandro Egas Silva was born in Quito, Ecuador, in 1889 and grew up in the San Blas neighborhood in the province of Pichincha to parents Camilo Egas Caldas, a professor, and Maria Zoila Silva Larrea, a homemaker. He began his primary education in 1895 at the Christian school named El Cebollar de Los Hermanos Cristianos. From an early age, he displayed a natural talent for the arts, spending his free time drawing in his father’s journals. He next studied at the San Gabriel y Mejia high schools before enrolling in fine arts. In 1905, he began his secondary education at the Escuela de Bellas Artes in Quito, where he received multiple accolades for his paintings. In 1909, Egas received two gold medals for his talent in his artistic coursework. Both medals awarded in the competitions from the Nacional del Centenario de la Independencia and the Universitario del Cartel. Additionally, in 1911, Egas earned a government-issued grant to study abroad at the Royal Academy of Rome. During the same year, and before the start of World War I, Egas returned to the Escuela de Bellas Artes, where he subsequently won the Catedra de Pintura competition. Between 1918-1923, Egas won two more competitions, one from the Salon Mariano Aguilera and the other from the Mariano Aguilera de Quito contest. In 1919, Egas studied at the Real Academia de Bellas Artes de San Fernando in Madrid on a second government grant. Egas also studied in the Académie Colarossi in Paris from 1920 to 1925, where he became the disciple and eventual friend of Pablo Picasso.

Indigenismo Movement in Ecuador
During the initial opening stages of the Escuela de Bellas Artes in Quito, in the early 1900s, the school began implementing a curriculum in correlation to the Ecuadorian’s efforts to create a modern national identity. The school’s mission was to emulate the European standard of art in order to portray the country’s newfound political and social agenda. This was evident in the way the school encouraged and pushed Neoclassicism in its programs of study. The school made efforts to send its students to study abroad in Europe and hired foreign artists to serve as teachers such as French Impressionist Paul Bar and Italian modernist sculptor Luigi Casadio. Between 1911-1915, Bar and Casadio started to separate themselves from the school’s European Neoclassical ideology. They instead focused on using and acknowledging the student’s surroundings and environment, going as far as implementing the usage of native individuals as live models. Hence, incorporating Ecuador’s cultural roots into the student’s artwork and in turn, modifying the traditional costumbrismo approach by making Indigenous Ecuadorian art more relevant.

After a three-year stay in Paris, Camilo Egas returned to Quito in 1915 following the intensification of World War I. It was during this time that Egas first experienced exposure to the revolutionary focus of Native American themes present in the Escuela de Bellas Artes. He studied and was influenced by Bar, Cassadio and the School director lithographer Víctor Puig, in choosing Indigenism as his artistic focus. Egas combined the Costumbrista painting tradition of Ecuador with the influences of contemporary art movements in other countries. He used his knowledge of European art techniques to create dramatic, large-scale oil paintings of Andean indigenous peoples and themes, bringing Indigenismo to the European ‘high art’ world. Egas’s ideology and aesthetic of the 1910s and 1920s connect him to Spanish modernism, a movement espoused by the School of Fine Arts at Quito, which was inspired by its modernity and nationalism. Egas applied the same Spanish standard of painting ethnic and exotic local subjects as a representation of Ecuadorian identity. In his decision to combine his globally acquired artisanship, Egas thus gained prestige by elevating the depiction of the native population in a refined aesthetic manner.

In 1926, Egas once again returned to Ecuador, playing a pivotal role in forming the Indigenist Movement. Other indigenists artists include Diógenes Paredes, Bolívar Mena Franco, Pedro León, Eduardo Kingman, and Oswaldo Guayasamin. The Indian theme seen in his work was related to the rise of Socialism and the constitution of Marxist parties in Latin America. In 1926, Egas opened and founded the first privately owned gallery in Quito and Ecuador’s first art periodical journal, Hélice (Helix)., referencing the modernist art magazines he had encountered in Paris. The magazine included literature, short stories, cartoons, and art opinions. The Ecuadorian novelist Pablo Palacio published his important short story “Un hombre muerto a puntapiés” in the Hélice magazine in 1926.

During this time in Ecuador, Egas taught at the Normal de Quito, taught some courses in the Escuela de Bellas Artes, and served as art director of the National Theatre. He also consecutively developed the Indeginism concept for the next 20 years by adding various style changes and social significance in two phases. The first phase pertains to Egas painting Ecuador’s native population and rituals in a dignified, formal, and ideal manner. Changing the scenery and depicting the locals based on historical context. After a few years, Egas moved away from painting romantic personifications and entered his second stage by portraying the Indigenous social condition. This stage would transform into Indigenist Pictorialism, which was seen later in the commissioned mural from the 1939 New York World’s Fair.

Move to United States 
According to Art Historian Michele Greet, Egas, full of new perspectives and insights on the European art styles, returns to Quito to start an Ecuadorian avant-garde movement of his own. He creates the country's first artistic journal Hélice and opens the first private owned gallery focusing on modern artwork. Nonetheless, these new artistic enterprises did not elicit enough local attention nor support, and therefore Egas decided to end both of his ventures. Greet surmises that the unsuccessful artistic endeavors, as well as his recent marriage to the North American dancer Margaret Gibbons perhaps encouraged Egas to move overseas; he subsequently established himself in Greenwich Village, New York. In 1927 at the time of his arrival, the United States was going through The Great Depression. The artistic focus was that of social content rather than the previous extravagant and luxurious representation of The Roaring 1920s. The United States, transfixed in redefining its national identity, became focused on depicting the reality and the disparity amongst the social classes. In 1932, Egas recently appointed a teaching position at The New School of Social Research in New York City, was commissioned by Alvin Johnson, the Director at the time, to begin work on a mural in front of the dance school titled, Ecuadorian Festival. For Camilo Egas, his mural was only a depiction of Ecuador’s cultural distinctiveness; however, Johnson reacted as if it was meant to be a societal message. Johnson’s interpretation of Egas’s choice of style, being Indigenism, similarly resonated with the American public, associating his indigenous subject matter as the similar plight of the social lower classes. Egas thus began painting the affected American workers and the homeless, subsequently accepting the recognition and the label of a social realist.

Mural for the 1939 New York World's Fair 
In 1939, Camilo Egas was responsible for decorating and painting a mural for the Ecuadorian Pavilion of the New York World’s Fair. The Museo Jijon y Caamano de Arqueologia y Arte Colonial in Quito commissioned him to paint a series of work in oils exploring Andean Indian life. Word got sent back to Ecuador of the Americans’ public recognition of Camilo Egas’s artistry in Social Realism. He was thus invited and contracted to design the Ecuadorian exhibition and its interior mural. However, the partnership and negotiations between Ecuador’s General Ministry of Foreign Affairs and the United States Directory of Foreign Participations would be troubled from the start. Multiple conflicting artistic and commercial interests, cultural versus social ideologies, and an overall lack of delegatory participation hindered the mural’s intended meaning and timely production. All these disagreements resulted in the national and public disappointment over the finalized mural. Ecuadorian audiences perceived the mural as an unacceptable representation of their national identity by portraying their country as an impoverished indigenous state. While the American audience viewed Egas’s attempt at symbolism as confusing and losing the effectiveness of Indigenism as a tool of social awareness. Nonetheless, according to Egas, his mural’s intention was not only to depict the fair’s theme of past and the present, but also to depict the future of Ecuador, and to embody a compilation of Ecuador’s rich history. Its main objective was to showcase the country’s native ancestry, artisanal and agriculture abundance, and the country’s overall modernization efforts. Nevertheless, the resulting criticism eventually led Camilo Egas to abandon Indigenism in its entirety, never to show his previous works in public galleries again. Subsequently, the mural was forgotten and consequently destroyed amid the rising military tension between Ecuador and Peru, ultimately culminating into a full-fledged war by 1941. However, before the growing political pressures, Egas would use this opportunity to establish transnational scholarships for other Ecuadorian artists to study in The New School of Social Research in New York City.

Later life 
From 1927 to the end of his life, Egas resided in New York City, but occasionally lived in Spain and Italy, and made numerous trips back to Ecuador. It was the early 1940s that altered his focus on forming a sense of a national character through indigenism. Post-WWII there was an influx of artists and ideas in New York, and according to Diana Mantilla, this nationalism possibly influenced Egas's experimentation with surrealism of the 1940s and 1950s, as a means of self-contemplation and artistic adaptation. Social Realism no longer held the same meaning as it did before, and a shift of his efforts to surrealism was a response to existentialist thought. As noted by Mantilla, through surrealism, Egas perhaps felt he was able to express his consciousness as well as inner turmoil. It brought him criticism, however, for example from Alvin Saunders Johnson, for a betrayal of his cultural integrity. Egas insisted that art meant being true to oneself, and a reflection of one's own life. He assimilated various styles: first, Social Realism, then surrealism, Neo-Cubism, and finally Abstract Expressionism.

In New York, he befriended José Clemente Orozco. In the 1930s, Egas's work included two murals, Harvesting Food in Ecuador: No Profit Motif in Any Face or Figure and Harvesting Food in North America. In 1932 Egas began teaching at the New School for Social Research in New York in and became their first Director of Art in 1935. Additionally, between 1945-1956, Egas used his position as an Art Director at The New School of Social Research to respond to the recent artist migration from WWII. He created workshops to enhance the school’s curriculum to be inclusive, progressive, and affordable to all. He taught and directed the art department until his death in 1962, the same year that the school gave him an honorary doctorate in fine arts. Also after his death, Egas was bestowed the prestigious American Academy Award of Arts and Letters.

During the 1950s, Egas exhibited his work in Caracas, Quito, and New York.

Egas died of cancer on September 18, 1962 in the Bronx, New York.

Legacy
The Museo Camilo Egas in Quito opened in 1981 with a permanent exhibition of his work. It was open for 15 years and then closed. In 2003 the Museo Camilo Egas was re-opened by the Banco Central del Ecuador. Now the collection belongs to the Ministerio de Cultura de Ecuador, and Museo Camilo Egas is located in this historic location in the Historic Center of Quito, in Venezuela street and Esmeraldas Corner.

See also
List of Ecuadorian artists

References

1889 births
1962 deaths
Modern artists
Ecuadorian painters
Ecuadorian emigrants to the United States
The New School faculty
Latin American artists of indigenous descent
20th-century indigenous painters of the Americas
Académie Colarossi alumni